The 2013 All-Ireland Minor Football Championship is the premier "knockout" competition for under-18 competitors who play the game of Gaelic football in Ireland. The games are organised by the Gaelic Athletic Association. The 2013 series of games started in May with the majority of the games played during the summer months. The All-Ireland Minor Football Final took place on 22 September in Croke Park, Dublin, preceding the Senior Game. In 2013 the title sponsor is Electric Ireland.
Mayo won the title after a 2–13 to 1–13 win against Tyrone.

Results & Fixtures

Munster Minor Football Championship

Ulster Minor Football Championship

Connacht Minor Football Championship

Leinster Minor Football Championship

All Ireland Series

All Ireland Series Quarter-finals

All Ireland Series Semi-finals

All Ireland Minor Football Final

References

All-Ireland Minor Football Championship
All-Ireland Minor Football Championship